John Maurice Glover Sirr (b. 1942) was Dean of Limerick and Ardfert from 1987 until 2011

Sirr was educated at Dundalk Grammar School and Trinity College, Dublin. He was ordained Deacon in 1965 and Priest in 1966. He held curacies in Belfast then Finaghy. He was the Incumbent at Drumcliff from 1969 until 1987.

One of his brothers, William James Douglas Sirr (born 1 July 1940), was also educated at Trinity College, Dublin and ordained. He served as an RAF Chaplain but died in 1991 while resident chaplain at the RAF Church of St Clement Danes.

Notes

1953 births
Living people
Alumni of Trinity College Dublin
Deans of Limerick and Ardfert